Switched is a 2018 Japanese-language streaming television series starring Miu Tomita, Kaya Kiyohara, Daiki Shigeoka, Tomohiro Kamiyama, Megumi Seki and Reika Kirishima. based on the 2014–15 manga series Sora wo Kakeru Yodaka by Shiki Kawabata. The series was directed by Hiroaki Matsuyama.

It was ordered direct-to-series, and the first full season premiered on Netflix streaming on August 1, 2018.

Premise
The plot in Switched revolves around how depressed high-school student Zenko Umine (Miu Tomita) commits suicide, with fellow student Ayumi (Kaya Kiyohara) seeing her fall from the school roof top to her death and then passes out herself. When Ayumi wakes up, she finds herself in Umine's body, while Umine is in Ayumi's body. The story follows the twists and turns of the character Umine and the reasons why she committed suicide, while social anxiety and depression are underlying themes throughout the series.

Cast
 Kaya Kiyohara as Ayumi Kohinata / Zenko Umine
 Miu Tomita as Zenko Umine / Ayumi Kohinata
 Daiki Shigeoka as Kaga Shunpei
 Tomohiro Kamiyama as Koshiro Mizumoto
 Megumi Seki as Ukon
 Reika Kirishima as Ayumi's mother

Episodes

Release
The full first season of Switched consisting of 6 episodes premiered on Netflix streaming on August 1, 2018.

References

External links
 
 
 

Japanese-language Netflix original programming
Drama web series
Science fiction web series
Japanese web series